The D.R. Glass Library, or Dominion Robert Glass Library, is a historic building and academic library built in 1948, and located at the Texas College campus at 2404 North Grand Avenue, Tyler, Texas. It is listed on the National Register of Historic Places since March 7, 2007.

History 
The D.R. Glass Library is part of Texas College, a historically black college, and was it designed by McKissack & McKissack, one of the oldest black-founded and owned architecture firms. The building was named after the former college president, Dominion Robert Glass (1895–1968). It is part of the HBCU Library Alliance.

McKissack & McKissack also designed the President's House at Texas College (1942), another NRHP listed building.

See also 

 National Register of Historic Places listings in Smith County, Texas

References

External links 
 Official website

National Register of Historic Places in Smith County, Texas
Buildings and structures completed in 1948
Libraries on the National Register of Historic Places in Texas
Texas College